Apostolepis tenuis, the Bolivian blackhead or Ruthven's burrowing snake, is a species of snake in the family Colubridae. It is found in Bolivia and Brazil.

References 

tenuis
Reptiles described in 1927
Reptiles of Bolivia
Reptiles of Brazil
Taxa named by Alexander Grant Ruthven